Joseph C. Ungerer (December 10, 1916 – July 15, 1990) was an American football tackle in the National Football League (NFL) for the Washington Redskins.  He played college football at Fordham University and was drafted in the 20th round of the 1941 NFL Draft by the Brooklyn Dodgers.

External links
 
 

1916 births
1990 deaths
Sportspeople from Bethlehem, Pennsylvania
American football tackles
Fordham Rams football players
Washington Redskins players
Players of American football from Pennsylvania